Lanthanum laurate is an metal-organic compound with the chemical formula . The compound is classified as a metallic soap, i.e. a metal derivative of a fatty acid (lauric acid).

References

Laurates
Lanthanum compounds